Aubin may refer to:

 Aubin (name), people with the given name or surname Aubin
 Aubin, Aveyron, France, a commune
 Aubin, Pyrénées-Atlantiques, France, a commune
 Aubin Codex, a textual and pictorial history of the Aztecs

See also

 Aubin blanc, a minor grape from Toul in Lorraine
 Aubin vert, a sibling of Chardonnay from Lorraine
 Aubin-Lions lemma, mathematical term
 Saint-Aubin (disambiguation)